Han Bennink (born 17 April 1942) is a Dutch drummer and percussionist. On occasion his recordings have featured him playing soprano saxophone, bass clarinet, trombone, violin, banjo and piano.

Though perhaps best known as one of the pivotal figures in early European free jazz and free improvisation, Bennink has worked in essentially every school of jazz, and is described by critic Chris Kelsey as "one of the unfortunately rare musicians whose abilities and interests span jazz's entire spectrum." Known for often injecting slapstick and absurdist humor into his performances, Bennink has had especially fruitful long-term partnerships with pianist Misha Mengelberg and saxophonist Peter Brötzmann. Han is a brother of saxophonist Peter Bennink.

Early life and education 
Bennink was born in Zaandam, the son of a classical percussionist. He played the drums and the clarinet during his teens.

Performing career 

Through the 1960s he was the drummer with a number of American musicians visiting the Netherlands, including Dexter Gordon, Wes Montgomery, Sonny Rollins and Eric Dolphy (he is present on Dolphy's recording, Last Date (1964)).

He subsequently became a central figure in the emerging European free improvisation scene. In 1963 he formed a quartet with pianist Misha Mengelberg and saxophonist Piet Noordijk which performed at the 1966 Newport Jazz Festival. In 1967 he was a co-founder of the Instant Composers Pool with Mengelberg and Willem Breuker, which sponsored Dutch avant garde performances. From the late 1960s, he played in a trio with saxophonist Peter Brötzmann and Belgian pianist Fred Van Hove, which became a duo after Van Hove's departure in 1976. Through much of the 1990s, he played in Clusone 3 (also known as the Clusone Trio), a trio with saxophonist/clarinetist Michael Moore and cellist Ernst Reijseger. He has often played duos with Mengelberg and collaborated with him alongside other musicians.

From the late 1980s through the early 2000s, Bennik collaborated closely with Dutch post-punk band The Ex, appearing on their 1995 album Instant and travelling and playing with them on their first tour to Ethiopia.

Recordings
As well as playing with these long-standing groups, Bennink has performed and recorded solo (Tempo Comodo (1982) being among his solo recordings) and played with many free improvisation and free jazz musicians including Derek Bailey, Conny Bauer, Don Cherry and Alexander von Schlippenbach, as well as more conventional jazz musicians such as Lee Konitz. In 1983 he collaborated with boogie-woogie pianist and vocalist Little Willie Littlefield for his album, I'm in the Mood.

Style 
Bennink's style is wide-ranging, running from conventional jazz drumming to highly unconventional free improvisation, for which he often uses whatever found objects happen to be onstage (chairs, music stands, instrument cases), his own body (a favourite device involves putting a drumstick in his mouth and striking it with the other stick), and the entire performance space—the floor, doors, and walls. He makes frequent use of birdcalls and whatever else strikes his fancy (one particularly madcap performance in Toronto in the 1990s involved a deafening fire alarm bell placed on the floor).

Discography
The following is a partial list of recordings by Han Bennink.

Solo albums 
 1970: Solo (Instant Composers Pool)
 1973: Nerve Beats (UMS, ALP, Atavistic)
 1979: Solo - West/East (FMP)
 1982: Tempo Comodo (Data Records)
 1997: Serpentine (Songlines Recordings)
 2001: Nerve Beats (Atavistic)
 2007: Amplified Trio (Treader Records)
 2009: Parken (ILK Music)

Collaborations 
As leader
 1968: Instant Composers Pool, (Instant Composers Pool), with Misha Mengelberg and John Tchicai
 1972: Derek Bailey & Han Bennink (Ictus) with Derek Bailey
 1979: A European Proposal (Live In Cremona) (Horo Records), including with Misha Mengelberg, Paul Rutherford and Mario Schiano
 1997: 3 (VIA Jazz), with Michiel Borstlap and Ernst Glerum
 2000: Jazz Bunker (Golden Years Of New Jazz), with Eugene Chadbourne and Toshinori Kondo
 2004: Free Touching (Live In Beijing At Keep In Touch) (Noise Asia), with Wong Young, Andreas Schreiber, Dennis Rea, Steffen Schorn, and Claudio Puntin
 2004: Home Safely (Favorite), with  Curtis Clark and Ernst Glerum
 2004: 3 (55 Records), with Michiel Borstlap and Ernst Glerum
 2005: BBG (Favorite), with Michiel Borstlap and Ernst Glerum
 2008: Monk Volume One (Gramercy Park Music), with Michiel Borstlap and Ernst Glerum
 2010: Laiv (Bassesferec), with Fabrizio Puglisi and Ernst Glerum
With Ray Anderson and Christy Doran
 1994: Azurety (hat ART)
 1995: Cheer Up (hat ART)
 2011: Who Is In Charge? (Kemo), including with Frank Möbus, Ernst Glerum, and Paul van Kemenade
With Gary Bartz, Lee Konitz, Jackie McLean and Charlie Mariano
Altissimo (Philips, 1973)
With Paul Bley and Annette Peacock
 1971: Improvisie (America)
 1972: Dual Unity (Freedom)
With Anthony Braxton
Anthony Braxton's Charlie Parker Project 1993 (HatART, 1993 [1995])
With Steve Beresford
 1987: Directly To Pyjamas (Nato)
 2002: B + B (Instant Composers Pool)
With Willem Breuker
 1967: New Acoustic Swing Duo (Instant Composers Pool)
With Eric Dolphy
 1964: Last Date (Limelight Records)
 1964: Playing: Epistrophy, June 1, 1964 In Eindhoven, Holland (ICP; includes Misha Mengelberg and Jacques Schols; rehearsal tape for the above concert issued 1975)
With Peter Brötzmann
 1968: Machine Gun (FMP)
 1969: Nipples (Calig)
 1970: Balls (FMP), including with Fred Van Hove
 1977: Ein Halber Hund Kann Nicht Pinkeln (FMP)
 1977: Schwarzwaldfahrt (FMP)
 1979: 3 Points And A Mountain (FMP), including with Misha Mengelberg
 1980: Atsugi Concert (Gua Bungue)
 2001: Fuck de Boere (Atavistic) recorded in 1968 and 1970
 2005: Still Quite Popular After All Those Years (BRÖ Records)
 2006: Total Music Meeting 1977 Berlin (BRÖ Records)
 2008: In Amherst 2006 (BRÖ Records)
With Eric Boeren
 2012: Coconut (De Platenbakkerij), including with Michael Moore and Wilbert de Joode
With Marion Brown
 1967: Porto Novo (Freedom)
With Sean Bergin
 1988: Kid's Mysteries  (Nimbus West)
With Uri Caine
 2013: Sonic Boom (816 Music)
With Eugene Chadbourne
 2001: 21 Years Later (Train Kept A Rollin') (Leo Records)
 2005: Chad And Han (House Of Chadula)
With Don Cherry
 1971: Orient (BYG)
 1971: Actions (Philips)
With Daniele D'Agaro
 2003: Strandjutters (hatOLOGY), including with Ernst Glerum
 2010: Fingerprints (Artesuono), including with Alexander von Schlippenbach
With Ellery Eskelin
 1998: Dissonant Characters (hatOLOGY)
With Terrie Ex (and others)
 2000: The Laughing Owl (Terp Records)
 2002: Ethiopia Tour 2002 (Not On Label)
 2006: Transparancy-Wolk 3 (Terp Records), including with Rik van Iersel, Bart Maris, and P Jacomyn
 2007: Zeng! (Terp Records)		
 2010: Let's Go (Terp Records), including with Brodie West
With Cor Fuhler and Wilbert De Joode
 1998: Bellagram (Geestgronden)
 1998: "Zilch" (ConundromCd)
 2003: Tinderbox (Data Records)
With Frode Gjerstad
 2009: Han & Frode (Cadence Jazz Records)
With Kees Hazevoet
 1978: Calling Down The Flevo Spirit (Snipe Records)
With Will Holshouser and Michael Moore
 2011: Live In NYC (Ramboy Recordings)
With Kazuo Imai
 2003: Across The Desert (Improvised Music From Japan)
With Mikko Innanen and Jaak Sooäär
 2006: Spring Odyssey (TUM Records)
With Instant Composers Pool
With Guus Janssen
 2005: Groet (Data Records)
With Steve Lacy
 1978: Lumps (Instant Composers Pool), including with Michel Waisvisz and Maarten Van Regteren Altena
With Little Willie Littlefield
 1983: I'm in the Mood (Oldie Blues)
With Keshavan Maslak
 1980: Humanplexity (Leo Records), including with Misha Mengelberg
 2008: Bim Huis Live 1st Set (Hum Ha Records)
With Myra Melford
 1997: Eleven Ghosts (hatOLOGY) recorded 1994
With Misha Mengelberg
 1971: Instant Composers Pool 010 (Instant Composers Pool)
 1972: Een Mirakelse Tocht Door Het Scharrebroekse no. 1-6 (Instant Composers Pool)
 1974: EinePartieTischtennis (FMP, Instant Composers Pool), live
 1975: Coincidents (Stichting ICP Geluidsdragers, Instant Composers Pool)
 1978: Midwoud 77 (Instant Composers Pool)
 1978: Groupcomposing (Instant Composers Pool), including with Peter Brötzmann, Evan Parker, Peter Bennink, Paul Rutherford, and Derek Bailey
 1978: Fragments (Instant Composers Pool), including with John Tchicai, and Derek Bailey
 1982: Bennink Mengelberg (Instant Composers Pool)
 1985: Change Of Season (Music Of Herbie Nichols) (Soul Note), including with Steve Lacy, George E. Lewis, and Arjen Gorter
 1991: Dutch Masters (Soul Note), with Steve Lacy, George Lewis, Ernst Reyseger, and Han Bennink
 1994: Mix (Instant Composers Pool)
 1996: The Instant Composers Pool 30 Years (Instant Composers Pool)
 1998: MiHa (Instant Composers Pool)
 2001: Four in One (Songlines Recordings), with Misha Mengelberg Quartet (Dave Douglas, Brad Jones, Han Bennink)
 2004: Senne Sing Song (Tzadik)
With Kenny Millions
 2003: Bootleg (Hum Ha Records)
With Pino Minafra
 1987: Tropic Of The Mounted Sea Chicken (Splasc(H) Records), including with Misha Mengelberg, Michele Lomuto, and Unknown Artist
 1991: Noci...Strani Frutti (Live At Europa Festival Jazz) (Leo Records), including with Ernst Reijseger
With Michael Moore
 2001: White Widow (Ramboy Recordings), including with Alex Maguire and Mark Helias
With Simon Nabatov
 2003: Chat Room (Leo Records)
With Armen Nalbandian
 2011: Coup de Grace (Blacksmith Brother)
With Mark O'Leary
 2008: Television (Ayler Records)
With Evan Parker
 1970: The Topography of the Lungs (Incus) with Derek Bailey
 2002: The Grass Is Greener (psi)
With Alessandra Patrucco
 2006: Circus (Instant Composers Pool), including with Tristan Honsinger, Misha Mengelberg, and Ab Baars
With Dudu Pukwana
 1979: Yi Yole (Instant Composers Pool), including with Misha Mengelberg
With Roswell Rudd
 1983: Regeneration (Soul Note), including with Steve Lacy, Kent Carter, and Misha Mengelberg
With Paul Ruys
 1966: Lover, Come Swing With Me (Philips), including with Pim Jacobs, Ruud Jacobs, and Wim Overgaauw
With Irene Schweizer
 1996: Irène Schweizer & Han Bennink (Intakt Records)
 2015: Welcome Back (Intakt Records)
With Jaak Sooäär
 2013: Beach Party (Barefoot Records)
With Spring Heel Jack
 2003: Live (Thirsty Ear), including with Matthew Shipp, Evan Parker, J Spaceman, and William Parker
With Aki Takase
 2011: Two for Two (Intakt Records)
With Cecil Taylor
 1988: Spots, Circles, and Fantasy (FMP)
With Rik van Iersel
 2005: Transparancy-Wolk No. 3 (Rikordings)

References

External links
Biography and discography from the European Free Improvisation Pages

FMP releases
 
 
: Solo by Bennink performed on a custom drum kit made from Dutch cheeses

Free jazz percussionists
Free jazz drummers
Dutch jazz drummers
Male drummers
Dutch jazz percussionists
1942 births
Living people
People from Zaanstad
Avant-garde jazz drummers
Avant-garde jazz percussionists
Male jazz musicians
ICP Orchestra members
The Ex (band) members
Clusone Trio members
Ilk Records artists
Atavistic Records artists
FMP/Free Music Production artists
Incus Records artists
Intakt Records artists